The 2013 Morocco Tennis Tour – Casablanca was a professional tennis tournament played on clay courts. It was the third edition of the tournament which was part of the 2013 ATP Challenger Tour. It took place in Casablanca, Morocco between 28 October –and 3 November 2013.

ATP entrants

Seeds

 Rankings are as of October 21, 2013.

Other entrants
The following players received wildcards into the singles main draw:
  Yassine Idmbarek
  Mehdi Jdi
  Hicham Khaddari
  Younès Rachidi

The following players received entry from the qualifying draw:
  Riccardo Ghedin
  Claudio Grassi
  Marc Rath
  Sherif Sabry

Champions

Singles

 Dominic Thiem def.  Potito Starace 6–2, 7–5

Doubles

 Claudio Grassi /  Riccardo Ghedin def.  Gero Kretschmer /  Alexander Satschko 6–4, 6–4

External links
Official Website
ITF Search
ATP official site

Morocco Tennis Tour - Casablanca
Morocco Tennis Tour – Casablanca
2013 Morocco Tennis Tour